Ernest John Yaw Owusu, Jr. (born May 26, 1988) is retired American football defensive end.

High school career
Owusu attended Father Ryan High School in Nashville, Tennessee and played varsity football for four years. After graduating Father Ryan, Owusu attended the Hun School of Princeton for an additional prep year. While at The Hun School, Owusu accumulated 62 tackles, 13 sacks, and 1 interception. He received scholarship offers from 24 Division 1 programs from which he chose the University of California, Berkeley.

College career
Over the course of his college career with the California Golden Bears, Owusu played in 42 games with 18 starts from 2008-11. He recorded 55 tackles, 14.0 tackles for loss (-61 yards), 8.0 sacks (-49 yards), 1 forced fumble, and 5 pass breakups. Owusu earned first-team Pac-12 All-Academic honors as a senior after being a second-team Pac-10 All-Academic selection during both sophomore and junior campaigns. He was a two-time first-team ESPN All-District® 8 pick as a junior and senior.

2007
Redshirted Owusu did not play.

2008
Owusu played in 5 games off the bench, recording 5 tackles, and 1.0 tackle for loss (-3 yards). He had a season-high 4 stops in his collegiate debut against Colorado State . Owusu’s other stop was a tackle for loss (-3 yards) in the regular-season finale vs. Washington. Owusu was second-team Pac-10 All-Academic selection.

2009
Owusu played in 12 games off the bench and finished the season with 7 tackles, a career-high 3.0 tackles for loss (-18 yards), a career-high 2.0 sacks (-15 yards) and one pass breakup. He recorded all of his sacks and tackles for loss in the season-opener vs. Maryland, with the 3.0 tackles for loss tying for the most by a Cal player in 2009 while both were career highs. Owusu had 3 tackles and his first career pass breakup vs. the Terrapins. He added two tackles in the second game of the season vs. Eastern Washington and then one each at UCLA and at Washington in the regular-season finale. Owusu was second-team Pac-10 All-Academic selection.

2010
Owusu played in all 12 games and moved into a primary starting role with starts in each of the season's first 9 games before coming off the bench in the final 3. He recorded a career-high 14 tackles, 2.5 tackles for loss (-10 yards) and 1.5 sacks (-9 yards), as well as a career-high 2 pass breakups. Owusu twice had a career-high-tying four tackles vs. Colorado and UCLA, adding 1.0 tackle for loss and 0.5 sacks for no gain vs. the Buffaloes, and 0.5 tackles for loss (-1 yard) and a quarterback hurry against the Bruins. He had a pair of tackles in back-to-back contests at Oregon State and Washington State, also picking up a sack for 9 yards against the Beavers. Owusu had single tackles vs. Arizona State and Washington, as well as a pass breakups at Nevada and vs. Oregon. He had a huge year in the classroom, earning first-team ESPN All-District® 8 and second-team Pac-10 All-Academic selections.

2011
Owusu played in all 13 games with nine starts, contributing 30 tackles to rank second among the team's defensive linemen behind Trevor Guyton. He also second on the team with 4.5 sacks (-25 yards) and fourth with 7.5 tackles for loss (-30). Owusu added a forced fumble, two pass breakups and a quarterback hurry. He had his biggest game of the season at Oregon with a career-high seven tackles, a season-high-tying 2.0 tackles for loss for a season-high 12 yards, a sack for a season-high 10 yards, a forced fumble and a pass breakup. Owusu had four tackles each at Colorado, vs. Utah and vs. Oregon State. He added a sack against both the Beavers (-9 yards) and Utes (-2 yards), as well as a total of 2.0 tackles for loss (-4 yards) against the Utes and 1.0 tackle for loss (-1 yard) against the Buffaloes. He had three tackles in the Holiday Bowl vs. Texas. Owusu had 1.5 sacks (-4 yards) against Presbyterian. His other pass breakup came in season-opener vs. Fresno State, while quarterback hurry came against USC. Owusu posted two tackles at Stanford. He had single tackles vs. Fresno State, at UCLA, vs. Washington State, and at Arizona State. Owusu picked up first-team ESPN All-District® 8 for the second consecutive year and first-team Pac-12 All-Academic honors for the first time. He earned the team's Dink Artal Award on the defensive side of the ball for the player best exemplifying Cal spirit. Owusu earned a spot on Phil Steele's midseason third-team All-Pac-12 squad.

College statistics

Professional career

2012 NFL Draft

Minnesota Vikings
On May 1, 2012, Owusu was signed as an undrafted free agent by the Minnesota Vikings. On November 12th, 2012, he was released by the Vikings.

Tampa Bay Buccaneers
On November 13, 2012, Owusu was signed to the Tampa Bay Buccaneers's practice squad. On August 26, 2013, he was waived by the Buccaneers.

San Jose SaberCats
On June 4, 2014, Owusu was assigned to the San Jose SaberCats of the Arena Football League (AFL).

Edmonton Eskimos
On June 6, 2014, Owusu agreed to terms Edmonton Eskimos of the Canadian Football League (CFL).

Las Vegas Outlaws

On December 22, 2014, Owusu was drafted by the Las Vegas Outlaws with the 2nd overall pick in the 2014 Expansion Draft.

Post Football career

As of August 2015, Ernest Owusu retired as a professional athlete and resides with his wife in the Bay Area. Since retiring he now works in the tech industry providing business development services for Persado.

As of 2019, he is the Director of Sales Development for 6sense.

References

External links
 Tampa Bay Buccaneers bio

1988 births
Living people
American football defensive ends
California Golden Bears football players
Edmonton Elks players
Las Vegas Outlaws (arena football) players
San Jose SaberCats players
Sportspeople from Burlington, Vermont
People from Nashville, Tennessee
Players of American football from Tennessee